The New Hope Missionary Baptist Church Cemetery is a cemetery on St. Marys Street in Lake Village, Arkansas.  The cemetery is located adjacent to a modern church that is located on the site of churches that have served Lake Village's African American population since 1860.

The historic portion of the cemetery, east and south of the church, was added to the National Register of Historic Places in 1992.  It is the only known site associated with the area's large African American population from the 19th century.

References

External links
 

National Register of Historic Places in Chicot County, Arkansas
Lake Village, Arkansas
1860 establishments in Arkansas
Cultural infrastructure completed in 1860
African-American cemeteries in Arkansas
Baptist Christianity in Arkansas